John Bedford Lloyd (born January 2, 1956) is an American character actor.

Life and career
Lloyd was born in New Haven, Connecticut, the son of Ann Storrs Lloyd and Edward B. Lloyd of Southport, Connecticut. His father was an architect.
He has a sister, Susan Storrs Lloyd, and a brother, Thomas Bedford Lloyd. Thomas was  married to Susan DeLong Ball.

While studying at Williams College in Williamstown, Massachusetts, he was cast in the play One Flew Over the Cuckoo's Nest, and decided to become a professional actor.

He later attended Yale School of Drama. After graduating, he moved to Manhattan and began his professional acting career on the stage. He's appeared in movies such as Trading Places, Crossing Delancey, Philadelphia, Fair Game, The Bourne Supremacy, Wall Street: Money Never Sleeps, The Front Runner and in TV series such as Hometown, Law & Order, Aliens in the Family, John Adams, and Ozark.

He married actress Anne Twomey on August 23, 1986. The couple has two daughters, Hannah and Elizabeth.

Filmography

Film

Television

References

External links
 

1956 births
Living people
American male film actors
American male television actors
Male actors from New Haven, Connecticut
Williams College alumni
Yale School of Drama alumni
20th-century American male actors
21st-century American male actors